Mordellistena smithiana is a species of beetle in the genus Mordellistena of the family Mordellidae. It was described by Wickham in 1913.

References

External links
Coleoptera. BugGuide.

Beetles described in 1913
smithiana